Mepenzolate is an antimuscarinic.

References 

Muscarinic antagonists
Quaternary ammonium compounds
Piperidines
Tertiary alcohols